The following is a list of notable deaths in April 2007.

Entries for each day are listed alphabetically by surname. A typical entry lists information in the following sequence:
 Name, age, country of citizenship at birth, subsequent country of citizenship (if applicable), reason for notability, cause of death (if known), and reference.

April 2007

1
Laurie Baker, 90, British-born Indian architect.
John Billings, 89, Australian co-developer of the Billings ovulation method.
Norman Butler, 76, English cricketer.
Herb Carneal, 83, American sportscaster, radio broadcaster for Minnesota Twins Major League Baseball team, congestive heart failure.
Driss Chraibi, 80, Moroccan writer.
Myrna "Screechy Peach" Crenshaw, 47, American singer and songwriter, breast cancer.
Char Fontane, 55, American actress and singer, daughter of Tony Fontane, breast cancer.
Lou Limmer, 82, American Major League Baseball player for the Philadelphia Athletics.
Salem Ludwig, 91, American actor (Unfaithful, Family Business, The Savages).
Sally Merchant, 88, Canadian broadcaster and politician, cancer.
Hannah Nydahl, 61, Danish teacher of Tibetan Buddhism, translator for her husband Ole Nydahl, lung and brain cancer.
Ladislav Rychman, 84, Czech film director, heart attack.
George Sewell, 82, British actor (Get Carter, Barry Lyndon, Doctor Who), cancer.
Elliott Skinner, 82, American scholar and former ambassador, heart failure.

2
B. K. Anand, 89, Indian physiologist and pharmacologist.
William W. Becker, 85, American co-founder of the Motel 6 chain, heart attack.
Janet Bloomfield, 53, British campaigner, Chair of the Campaign for Nuclear Disarmament (1993–1996), septic shock.
Jeannie Ferris, 66, Australian Senator, ovarian cancer.
Henry Lee Giclas, 96, American astronomer.
Paul Reed, 97, American comedian and actor (Car 54, Where Are You?), heart failure.
Tadjou Salou, 32, Togolese international footballer, after long illness.

3
Marion Eames, 85, British novelist (The Secret Room).
Sir Walter Luttrell, 87, British army officer and public servant.
Robin Montgomerie-Charrington, 91, British 1952 Grand Prix driver.
Michael Joseph Murphy, 91, American Roman Catholic prelate, Bishop of Erie (1982–1990).
Walter Nicks, 81, American dancer and choreographer.
Thomas Hal Phillips, 84, American novelist and screenwriter.
Zoltán Pongrácz, 95, Hungarian composer and conductor.
Bill Robinson, 88, American sailor and author.
Eddie Robinson, 88, American college football coach (Grambling State University), Alzheimer's disease.
Burt Topper, 78, American screenwriter, film director and film producer, pulmonary failure.
Nina Wang, 69, Hong Kong businesswoman and Asia's richest woman.

4
Jagjit Singh Chauhan, 80, Indian Sikh separatist leader, heart attack.
Bob Clark, 67, American film director (A Christmas Story, Porky's, Baby Geniuses), car accident.
Brian Fahey, 87, British composer and musical director.
Reginald H. Fuller, 92, British-born biblical scholar and Anglican priest, complications of a broken hip.
Terry Hall, 80, British ventriloquist and children's television presenter.
Edward Mallory, 76, American television actor (Days of Our Lives).
Datuk K. Sivalingam, 59, Malaysian politician, heart attack.
Karen Spärck Jones, 71, British professor emeritus of Computers and Information at the University of Cambridge, cancer.
Margaret Tor-Thompson, 44, Liberian politician, breast cancer.

5
Maria Gripe, 83, Swedish author.
Thomas Stoltz Harvey, 94, American pathologist.
Leela Majumdar, 99, Indian Bengali language children's author.
Mark St. John, 51, American guitarist (KISS, White Tiger), brain hemorrhage.
Ali Sriti, 88, Tunisian oudist.
Darryl Stingley, 55, American football player, bronchial pneumonia.
Poornachandra Tejaswi, 68, Indian writer and novelist in the Kannada language, cardiac arrest.

6
Elward Thomas Brady, Jr., 60, American businessman and politician.
Luigi Comencini, 90, Italian film director.
Stan Daniels, 72, Canadian writer and producer (Taxi, The Mary Tyler Moore Show, The Tonight Show Starring Johnny Carson), heart failure.
Colin Graham, 75, British opera, theatre and television director, cardiac arrest.
George C. Jenkins, 98, American Academy Award-winning production designer (All the President's Men, Sophie's Choice, Presumed Innocent), heart failure.
Józef Kos, 106, Polish soldier, one of the last six World War I veterans from Germany.
Jill McGown, 59, British mystery writer.
James McGuinness, 81, British priest, Bishop of Nottingham (1974–2000).
Raymond G. Murphy, 77, American Medal of Honor recipient during the Korean War.
Jeff Uren, 81, British racing driver.

7
Neville Duke, 85, British World War II fighter pilot.
Marià Gonzalvo, 85, Spanish captain of FC Barcelona and international footballer for Spain.
Johnny Hart, 76, American cartoonist (B.C., The Wizard of Id), stroke.
Brian Miller, 70, British footballer for Burnley and England.
Otto Natzler, 99, American ceramics and glazing master, cancer.
Barry Nelson, 89, American actor (The Shining), first to play James Bond on screen.
Du'a Khalil Aswad, 17, Yazidi murder

8
Charles Bain, 93, Trinidadian West Indian Test cricket umpire.
Natalia Clare, 87, American ballet dancer and instructor, complications of strokes.
Asad Amanat Ali Khan, 51, Pakistani singer, heart attack.
Victor Kneale, 89, Manx Speaker of the House of Keys (1990–1991).
Sol LeWitt, 78, American artist known for his role in the Conceptualism and Minimalism movements, cancer.
Bill Mescher, 79, American politician, member of the South Carolina Senate from 1993 until his death, stroke.

9
Florence Arrowsmith, 102, British marital recordholder.
Egon Bondy, 77, Czech philosopher and poet.
AJ Carothers, 75, American playwright and television writer, cancer.
Bob Coats, 82, British economic historian.
Alain Etchegoyen, 55, French philosopher, cancer.
Sir Michael Fox, 85, British judge, Lord Justice of Appeal (1981–1992).
Dorrit Hoffleit, 100, American research astronomer, cancer.
Mark Langford, 42, British businessman, former head of The Accident Group, car accident.
Philip Mayne, 107, English officer, last surviving British officer of World War I.
Harry Rasky, 78, Canadian documentary film producer, heart failure.

10
Kevin Crease, 70, Australian television newsreader, cancer.
Walter Hendl, 90, American conductor, heart and lung disease.
Ralph Heywood, 85, American football player.
Awdy Kulyýew, 70, Turkmen exiled politician and Foreign Minister (1990–1992), complications from stomach surgery.
George Mussallem, 99, Canadian politician and businessman.
Salvatore Scarpitta, 88, American sculptor, complications from diabetes.
Dakota Staton, 76, American jazz vocalist, after long illness.

11
Roscoe Lee Browne, 84, American Emmy Award-winning actor (The Cosby Show, Soap), stomach cancer.
James Lee Clark, 38, American murderer, execution by lethal injection.
Loïc Leferme, 36, French free diver, drowning.
Warren E. Preece, 85, American editor of Encyclopædia Britannica (1964–1975), heart failure.
Ronald Speirs, 86, American World War II commanding officer of Easy Company, 506th Infantry Regiment.
Warren Strelow, 73, American ice hockey goaltending coach for 1980 Winter Olympics gold medal team (Miracle on Ice).
Kurt Vonnegut, 84, American novelist and social critic, brain injury from a fall.

12
Kelsie B. Harder, 84, American name expert, congestive heart failure.
Len Hill, 65, British cricketer for Glamorgan and footballer for Newport County.
James K. Lyons, 46, American film editor (Far from Heaven, The Virgin Suicides), squamous cell carcinoma.
Pierre Probst, 93, French children's book author and illustrator.
Little Sonny Warner, 77, American singer who earned a gold record with "There's Something on Your Mind".

13
Birgitta Arman, 86, Swedish actress.
Marie Clay, 81, New Zealand world-renowned literacy expert, after short illness.
Nathan Heffernan, 86, American judge, Chief Justice of the Wisconsin Supreme Court (1983–1995).
Hans Koning, 85, Dutch-born writer and journalist.
Joe Lane, 80, Australian bebop jazz singer.
Steve Malovic, 50, American-Israeli basketball player, heart attack.
Wilma Elizabeth McDaniel, 88, American poet who wrote about the Dust Bowl.
Neil Pickard, 78, Australian politician.
Capil Rampersad, 46, Trinidad and Tobago cricketer.
Joie Ray, 83, American open-wheel and stock car race driver, respiratory failure.
Don Selwyn, 71, New Zealand actor and director, complications from a kidney infection.
Marion Yorck von Wartenburg, 102, German World War II resistance fighter.

14
Ladislav Adamec, 80, Czech communist politician, Prime Minister of the Czechoslovak Socialist Republic (1988–1989).
Robert Buck, 93, American aviator who set several aviation records in his teens, complications from a fall.
June Callwood, 82, Canadian journalist and activist, cancer.
Bobby Cram, 67, British footballer for West Bromwich Albion and Colchester United.
Don Ho, 76, American Hawaiian musician and entertainer, heart failure.
Jim Jontz, 55, American congressman from Indiana (1987–1993), colon cancer.
Meredith Kline, 84, American theologian and Old Testament scholar.
William Menster, 94, American Catholic priest, first member of the clergy to visit Antarctica.
René Rémond, 88, French historian and academician.
Mike Reynolds, British conservationist.
Herman Riley, 73, American tenor saxophone jazz performer, heart failure.
Audrey Santo, 23, American brain-injured girl claimed to have performed miracles, cardio-respiratory failure.
Jim Thurman, 72, American children's television writer and voice of Sesame Street's "Teeny Little Super Guy", illness.
Mike Webb, 51, American radio personality, stabbed.
Frank Westheimer, 95, American chemist.

15
Patricia Buckley, 80, Canadian-born socialite and fundraiser, wife of William F. Buckley, Jr., infection after long illness.
Heo Se-uk, 54, South Korean protester against U.S.-Korea Free Trade Agreement, septic shock following self-immolation burns.
Brant Parker, 86, American cartoonist who co-created The Wizard of Id.
Justine Saunders, 54, Australian actress, cancer.
Peter Tsiamalili, 54, Papua New Guinean first administrator of the Autonomous Region of Bougainville.
Donald Tuzin, 62, American anthropologist and leading authority on Melanesian culture, pulmonary hypertension.

16
Frank Bateson, 97, New Zealand astronomer and writer.
Tran Bach Dang, 81, Vietnamese journalist and politician.
Robert Desbats, 85, French cyclist.
Gaetan Duchesne, 44, Canadian NHL player (1981–1995), heart attack.
Robert Jones, 56, British Conservative politician (MP 1983–1997), minister in the government of John Major, liver cancer.
Maria Lenk, 92, Brazilian Olympic swimmer (1932, 1936), rupture of aortic aneurysm.
Jack Wiebe, 70, Canadian politician, Lieutenant Governor of Saskatchewan (1994–2000), Senator (2000–2004), lung cancer.
Notable people killed in Virginia Tech shooting:
Jamie Bishop, 35, Canadian instructor of German, homicide.
Seung-Hui Cho, 23, South Korean mass murdererer and student, suicide by gunshot.
Jocelyne Couture-Nowak, 49, Canadian instructor of French, homicide.
Kevin Granata, 45, American associate professor of engineering, homicide.
Liviu Librescu, 76, Romanian-born professor of engineering, Holocaust survivor, homicide.
G. V. Loganathan, 50, Indian-born professor of engineering, homicide.

17
Nair Bello, 75, Brazilian actress, heart failure.
Archie Campbell, 65, Canadian jurist.
James B. Davis, 90, American founder of The Dixie Hummingbirds, heart failure.
Steven Derounian, 89, Bulgarian-born American Republican Representative from New York state (1953–1965).
Len Fitzgerald, 76, Australian footballer, cancer.
Kitty Carlisle, 96, American actress (A Night at the Opera), TV personality (To Tell the Truth) and singer, heart failure.
Bruce Haslingden, 84, Australian Olympic cross-country skier, staphylococcus infection.
Raymond Kaelbel, 75, French international footballer.
Leyly Matine-Daftary, 70, Iranian artist.
Chauncey Starr, 95, American electrical engineer, pioneer in the field of nuclear energy.
Glenn Sutton, 69, American country songwriter and record producer, heart attack.

18
Josy Gyr-Steiner, 57, Swiss politician.
Iccho Itoh, 61, Japanese mayor of Nagasaki, shooting.
Andrej Kvašňák, 70, Slovak footballer, lung cancer.
Harry Miller, 83, American baseball player.
Alvin Roth, 92, American contract bridge champion.
Donald Stephens, 79, American long-serving mayor of Rosemont, Illinois, founder of Hummel figurine museum, stomach cancer.
Tony Suarez, 51, American soccer player (Carolina Lightnin', Cleveland Force), 1981 Rookie of the Year
Dick Vosburgh, 77, American-born comedy writer and lyricist, cancer.

19
Ken Albers, 82, American singer (The Four Freshmen).
Anthony Brooks, 85, British agent who led French Resistance saboteurs after the Normandy Invasion, stomach cancer.
Jean-Pierre Cassel, 74, French actor, cancer.
Dermot Chichester, 7th Marquess of Donegall, 91, Irish soldier and aristocrat.
Marie Hicks, 83, American civil rights activist, complications from Parkinson's disease.
George Logie-Smith, 92, Australian musician.
Worth McDougald, 82, American journalism educator, Director of the Peabody Awards (1963–1991), heart failure.
Bohdan Paczyński, 67, Polish astrophysicist, brain tumor.
Leszek Suski, 77, Polish Olympic fencer.
Helen Walton, 87, American widow of Wal-Mart founder Sam Walton, natural causes.
George D. Webster, 61, American football player.

20
Yehuda Meir Abramowicz, 92, Israeli General Secretary of Agudat Israel (1972–1981).
Audrey Fagan, 44, Irish-born Australian Federal Police assistant commissioner, suspected suicide by hanging.
Fred Fish, 54, American computer programmer known for GNU Debugger.
*Michael Fu Tieshan, 75, Chinese Patriotic Catholic Association bishop of Beijing, cancer.
Andrew Hill, 75, American jazz pianist and composer, lung cancer.
Jan Kociniak, 69, Polish actor.
William Phillips, 60, American engineer, Johnson Space Center shooting gunman, suicide by gunshot.
Robert Rosenthal, 89, American distinguished World War II pilot and lawyer, multiple myeloma.

21
Boscoe Holder, 85, Trinidadian dancer, choreographer and painter.
George Howard, Jr., 82, American federal judge.
James Hamupanda Kauluma, 75, Namibian bishop and freedom fighter, prostate cancer.
C. Bruce Littlejohn, 93, American jurist, Chief Justice of South Carolina.
Lobby Loyde, 65, Australian rock guitarist (Billy Thorpe & the Aztecs), lung cancer.
Parry O'Brien, 75, American shot put champion at the 1952 and 1956 Olympics, heart attack.
Art Saaf, 85, American comic book artist (Sheena, Queen of the Jungle), Parkinson's disease.
Bruce Van Sickle, 90, American federal judge (1971–2002), Alzheimer's disease.
Don White, 81, English rugby union player and coach.

22
Ruth Frankenberg, 49, British sociologist, lung cancer.
Sir Raymond Hoffenberg, 84, South African-born endocrinologist, President of RCP (1983–1989) and Chair of the BHF.
Karl Holzamer, 100, German founder and director-general of TV channel ZDF.
Juanita Millender-McDonald, 68, American Democratic Representative (Calif.), Chair of House Administration Committee, cancer.
Conchita Montenegro, 94, Spanish actress.
Anne Pitoniak, 85, American character actress, cancer.

23
Walter Bareiss, 87, German-American art collector, heart failure.
Tony Bridge, 92, British Anglican priest, Dean of Guildford (1968–1986).
Paul Erdman, 74, American economist, banker, and writer.
David Halberstam, 73, American Pulitzer Prize-winning journalist and author, car accident.
Axel Madsen, 77, American biographer, pancreatic cancer.
Michael Smuin, 68, American ballet dancer, choreographer and director, heart attack.
Boris Yeltsin, 76, Russian politician, first President of the Russian Federation (1991–1999), heart failure.

24
Warren Avis, 91, American founder of Avis Rent a Car System and real estate developer.
Ida R. Hoos, 94, American sociologist and critic of systems analysis, pneumonia.
Roy Jenson, 80, Canadian actor, cancer.
Jim Moran, 88, American automotive dealer and philanthropist.
James Richards, 58, American veterinarian and feline expert, motorcycle accident while avoiding a cat.
Kate Walsh, 60, Irish Progressive Democrat senator.
Robert M. Warner, 79, American archivist who led the National Archives and Records Administration, heart attack.

25
Edward Astley, 22nd Baron Hastings, 95, British landowner and politician.
Alan Ball, 61, British footballer, youngest member of England's 1966 World Cup-winning team, heart attack.
Barbara Blida, 57, Polish politician, suicide by gunshot.
Polly Hill, 100, American horticulturist, founder of Polly Hill Arboretum.
Les Jackson, 86, British cricketer, fast-medium bowler for Derbyshire and England.
Arthur Milton, 79, British sportsman, last person to play both football and cricket for England, heart attack.
Johnny Perkins, 54, American National Football League player for the New York Giants, complications following heart surgery
Bobby "Boris" Pickett, 69, American one-hit wonder singer ("Monster Mash"), leukemia.
Edgar Wisniewski, 76, German architect.

26
Ardhendu Das, 96, Indian cricketer.
Florea Dumitrache, 58, Romanian football player, digestive hemorrhage.
Wolfgang Gewalt, 78, German zoologist, director of the Duisburg Zoo (1966–1993).
Lindsey Hughes, 57, British professor of Russian History at University College London, cancer.
Henry LeTang, 91, American choreographer.
Jack Valenti, 85, American president of the Motion Picture Association of America (1966–2004), complications of stroke.

27
Al Hunter Ashton, 49, English actor and scriptwriter, heart failure.
Svatopluk Beneš, 89, Czech actor.
Karel Dillen, 81, Belgian politician, founder of the Flemish Interest party.
Bill Forester, 74, American NFL football player.
Magda Gerber, 90s, Hungarian-born American educator.
Raymond Guégan, 85, French cyclist.
Kirill Lavrov, 81, Russian actor, after long illness.
Mstislav Rostropovich, 80, Russian cellist and conductor, intestinal cancer.
Robert E. Webber, 73, American scholar and author on Christian worship renewal, pancreatic cancer.

28
Belinda Bidwell, 71, Gambian politician, Speaker of the National Assembly.
Lloyd Crouse, 88, Canadian politician, Progressive Conservative MP (1957–1988), Lieutenant Governor of Nova Scotia (1989–1994).
Luigi Filippo D'Amico, 82, Italian film director.
Dabbs Greer, 90, American actor (The Green Mile, Little House on the Prairie, Invasion of the Body Snatchers).
Sir Anthony Lambert, 96, British diplomat.
René Mailhot, 64, Canadian journalist for Radio-Canada, pneumonia.
Tommy Newsom, 78, American musician from The Tonight Show, cancer.
David Turnbull. 92, American materials scientist.
Carl Friedrich von Weizsäcker, 94, German physicist and philosopher.
Bertha Wilson, 83, Canadian who was the first female Supreme Court judge, Alzheimer's disease.

29
Georges Aminel, 84, French actor and voice actor.
Milt Bocek, 94, American baseball player.
Octavio Frias, 94, Brazilian publishing magnate, kidney failure.
Josh Hancock, 29, American baseball relief pitcher for the St. Louis Cardinals, car accident.
Donald P. Lay, 80, American judge of the Court of Appeals for the Eighth Circuit (1966–2006).
Dick Motz, 67, New Zealand test cricketer.
Joseph Nérette, 83, Haitian judge and politician, President of Haïti (1991–1992), lung cancer.
Arve Opsahl, 85, Norwegian actor, heart failure.
Sir George Pinker, 82, British obstetrician and gynaecologist.
Ivica Račan, 63, Croatian prime minister (2000–2003), cancer.
Lee Roberson, 97, American founder of Tennessee Temple University.

30
Edward F. Boyd, 92, American marketing executive at Pepsi who shunned racial stereotypes in advertising.
Tom Cartwright, 71, British test cricketer for England, complications of heart attack.
Grégory Lemarchal, 23, French singer, winner of Star Academy France, cystic fibrosis.
Bernard Marszałek, 31, Polish offshore powerboat racer, 2003 World Champion, 2004 Euro Championship runner-up, asthma.
Kevin Mitchell, 36, American football player for San Francisco 49ers (Super Bowl XXIX) and Washington Redskins, heart attack.
Grisha Ostrovski, 88, Bulgarian film director.
Tom Poston, 85, American actor (Newhart, Mork & Mindy, Up the Academy), Emmy winner (1959).
Claude Saunders, 95, Canadian rower and second-oldest national Olympic competitor.
Gordon Scott, 80, American actor who portrayed Tarzan in six films (1955–1960), complications of surgery.
Zola Taylor, 69, American singer, member of The Platters (1954–1964), complications of pneumonia.

References

2007-04
 04